Anophiodes pulchrilinea is a species of moth of the family Erebidae. It is found in the Philippines (Luzon).

References

Moths described in 1929
Anophiodes
Moths of the Philippines